Japanese football in 2014.

J.League Division 1

J.League Division 2

J3 League

Japan Football League

National team (Men)

Results

Players statistics

National team (Women)

Results

Players statistics

References

 
Seasons in Japanese football